Bijpur Assembly constituency is an assembly constituency in North 24 Parganas district in the Indian state of West Bengal.

Overview
As per orders of the Delimitation Commission, No. 103 Bijpur Assembly constituency is composed of the following: Kanchrapara municipality and Halisahar municipality.

Bijpur Assembly constituency is part of No. 15 Barrackpore (Lok Sabha constituency).

Members of Legislative Assembly

Election results

2021

2016

2011
In the 2011 elections, SubhransHu Roy of Trinamool Congress defeated his nearest rival Nirjharini Chakraborty of CPI(M).

.*Swing calculated on Congress+Trinamool Congress vote percentages taken together in 2006.

1977-2006
In the 2006 state assembly elections Dr. Nirjharini Chakraborty of CPI(M) won the Bijpur seat defeating Kalyani Biswas (Basu) of Trinamool Congress. Contests in most years were multi cornered but only winners and runners are being mentioned. In 2001, Jagadish Chandra Das of CPI(M) won defeating Jagadish Das, son of Akul Das, of Trinamool Congress. Kamal Sengupta Basu of CPI(M) defeated Mrinal Kanti Singha Roy of Congress in 1996. Jagadish Chandra Das of CPI(M) defeated Bimalananda Dutta of Congress in 1991 and 1987, Prabir Bandopadhyay of Congress in 1982 and Jagadish Chandra Das, s/o Akul in 1977.

1951-1972
Jagadish Chandra Das, s/o Akul, of Congress won in 1972 and 1971. Jagadish Chandra Das of CPI(M) won in 1969 and 1967. Monoranjan Roy of CPI won in 1962.Niranjan Sengupta of CPI won in 1957 and in independent India's first election in 1951.

References

Assembly constituencies of West Bengal
Politics of North 24 Parganas district